In mathematics, an alternating algebra is a -graded algebra for which  for all nonzero homogeneous elements  and  (i.e. it is an anticommutative algebra) and has the further property that  for every homogeneous element  of odd degree.

Examples 

 The differential forms on a differentiable manifold form an alternating algebra.
 The exterior algebra is an alternating algebra.
 The cohomology ring of a topological space is an alternating algebra.

Properties
 An anticommutative algebra  over a (commutative) base ring  in which 2 is not a zero divisor is alternating.

See also
 Alternating multilinear map
 Exterior algebra
 Graded-symmetric algebra

References

Algebraic geometry